Clare Eugene Hoffman (September 10, 1875 – November 3, 1967) was a United States representative from Michigan's 4th congressional district.

Background
Hoffman was born in Vicksburg, Union County, Pennsylvania, where he attended the public schools. He graduated from the law department of Northwestern University in Evanston, Illinois, in 1895.

Career
Hoffman was admitted to the Michigan Bar in 1896 and commenced practice in Allegan, Michigan, where he also became prosecuting attorney for the county from 1904–1910.

In 1934, Hoffman ran as the Republican candidate for Michigan's 4th congressional district, defeating incumbent Democrat George Ernest Foulkes. Hoffman was elected to the Seventy-fourth United States Congress and was re-elected to the thirteen succeeding Congresses, serving from January 3, 1935 until January 3, 1963. He was seen as "a bitter lone wolf" during much of his time in office, unable to work with either the Democrats or the Republicans. Hoffman voted against the Civil Rights Acts of 1957 and 1960, as well as the 24th Amendment to the U.S. Constitution.

Hoffman was a vocal opponent of the National Polio Immunization Program, claiming that the U.S. Public Health Service had been heavily infiltrated by Russian-born doctors. In addition, he was known as an anti-Semite with fascist sympathies, even speaking at rallies held for the far-right America First Party (1944).

He was chairman, Committee on Expenditures in the Executive Departments (Eightieth Congress) and the Committee on Government Operations (Eighty-third Congress). He was not a candidate for renomination in 1962 to the Eighty-eighth Congress.

Hoffman retired to his home in Allegan, Michigan.

Personal and death

Hoffman died at home, age 92. He was interred at Oakwood Cemetery in Allegan.

Bibliography
Walker, Donald Edwin. "The Congressional Career of Clare E. Hoffman, 1935-63." Ph.D. diss., Michigan State University, 1982.

References

Sources

The Political Graveyard

Further reading
Hoffman's entry at American National Biography Online.

External links
 

1875 births
1967 deaths
People from Union County, Pennsylvania
Republican Party members of the United States House of Representatives from Michigan
Old Right (United States)
People from Allegan, Michigan
Michigan lawyers
Northwestern University Pritzker School of Law alumni
American anti-communists
20th-century far-right politicians in the United States